Vidochov is a municipality and village in Jičín District in the Hradec Králové Region of the Czech Republic. It has about 400 inhabitants.

Administrative parts
The village of Stupná is an administrative part of Vidochov.

References

Villages in Jičín District